Tajlapur is a village in the southern state of Karnataka, India. It is located in Chincholi taluk of Kalburgi district. The nearest villages are Kanakpur and Chimmanchod

Demographics
 India census Tajlapur had a population of 890 with 480 males and 410 females.

Education Institutions
The school in Tajlapur is *Government higher primary school.

Agriculture
Major Crops produced in the Tajlapur are Pigeon pea, Sorghum, Pearl millet, chickpea, mung bean, vigna mungo.

Transport
KSRTC bus facility is available to travel within the Karnataka state and Nabour states, to travel within 15 to 20 km, share auto available. The nearest railway station is (45 km) tandur railway station TDU. The nearest airport is (157 km) Rajiv Gandhi International Airport.

See also
 Gulbarga
 Districts of Karnataka

References

External links
 http://Gulbarga.nic.in

Villages in Kalaburagi district